Jake Matthew Foley (born 21 September 1994) is an English cricketer. Foley is a left-handed, batsman and right arm leg spin bowler who was born in Colchester, Essex and educated at Felsted School in Essex.

Foley made his debut for Hampshire in a List A match against Sri Lanka A at the Ageas Bowl in August 2014. However, the match was abandoned after 18 overs due to rain with Foley not having batted or bowled.

Foley was appointed Captain of Colchester and East Essex Cricket club in 2017 making him the youngest 1XI captain in the club's history.

During the winter of 2017–2018, Foley spent his time in Western Australia, playing for Peel side Pinjarra Cricket club. It was established in 1874 and is the second oldest club in Western Australia. During his time as the overseas pro, Foley took 42 wickets including 33 in the league and nine in the Peel T20 competition in which he captained and led Pinjarra Cricket club to a first grand final win since 2012.

At the start of the 2019 English domestic season, Foley signed for East Anglian Premier League side Saffron Walden Cricket Club. After a poor piece of calling by Mickey Wallis, Foley ended up being run out for 2 in his first game, he soon recovered and notched his first half century against Great Witchingham Cricket Club on 4 May 2019.

References

External list

1994 births
Living people
Sportspeople from Colchester
English cricketers
Hampshire cricketers
Suffolk cricketers